Špik is a mountain in the Slovenian Julian Alps. Its summit is at 2,472 m (8110 feet) above sea level. The mountain's name is a cognate of the English "spike," derived from its pointed shape.

Normal climbing routes
There are two normal routes and they both start in Krnica valley, and they merge under the summit. One of them goes over the summit of Lipnica and the other is the 
Kacji Graben route. The former has a few easy sections with fixed cables and the latter is just a steep walk up. Both are snow-free in summer months. Around 5 hours is needed from the valley to the summit.

Huts
There are many huts around the nearby Vrsic Pass, but the hut closest to the start of the routes is the Krnica hut which is at 1113 meters above sea. So from the hut to the summit there are 1304 meters of elevation difference to climb.

History
In May 1952, a mountaineering accident occurred on the northern face of Špik, resulting in the death of five mountaineers from Slovenska Bistrica aged between 21 and 25.

See also 
 Mountains of Slovenia

References

External links 
 Špik on hribi.net
 Climbing Špik on Mountains for Everybody

Mountains of the Julian Alps
Two-thousanders of Slovenia
1952 in Slovenia